Emmerdale is a British television soap opera first broadcast on ITV on 16 October 1972. The following is a list of characters who currently appear in the programme, listed in order of first appearance. Some characters have been recast since their first appearance and other characters may have multiple actors sharing the role. In these cases, the most recent actor to portray the role is listed first.

Present characters

Regular characters

Recurring and guest characters

Former characters

Lists of characters by year of introduction 

 1972–1973
 1974
 1977
 1978–1979
 1982
 1988
 1989
 1990
 1991
 1993
 1994
 1995
 1996
 1997
 1998
 1999
 2000
 2001
 2002
 2003
 2004
 2005
 2006
 2007
 2008
 2009
 2010
 2011
 2012
 2013
 2014
 2015
 2016
 2017
 2018
 2019
 2020
 2021
 2022

References

External links 
 Characters and cast at itv.com
 Characters and cast at IMDb